Miloš Šatara (born 28 October 1995) is a Bosnian-Herzegovinian footballer who plays for Russian club Akhmat Grozny.

Club career

Kozara Gradiška
Born in Gradiška, Šatara started his career with local club Kozara at the age of 16. He collected 36 caps for 2 seasons in the First League of the Republika Srpska, for the period between 2013 and 2015, scoring 2 goals in each of the seasons. As a coincidence, 3 of 4 goals he scored in 20 minutes of those matches, and fourth in 22 minutes. Šatara also captained the team in 22 fixture of 2014–15 season, against Napredak Donji Šepak. After the end of season, he left the club.

Mladost Lučani
In summer 2015 he moved to Serbia, and joined Mladost Lučani, as a member of Bosnia and Herzegovina U21 national team selection. He made his professional debut for Mladost Lučani in the first fixture of Serbian SuperLiga against Jagodina. Although his career as a defensive midfielder, Šatara converted position on the field in later years. Playing with Mladost, he has been usually used as a defender.

Akhmat Grozny
On 12 January 2023, Šatara signed with Russian Premier League club FC Akhmat Grozny.

International career
Šatara made his first international appearances with Bosnia and Herzegovina under-18 level. Later he has also been called in selections under-19 and 21 years.

Career statistics

Club

Notes & references

External links
 Miloš Šatara stats at utakmica.rs 
 
 
 
 

1995 births
Living people
People from Gradiška, Bosnia and Herzegovina
Serbs of Bosnia and Herzegovina
Association football defenders
Bosnia and Herzegovina footballers
Bosnia and Herzegovina youth international footballers
Bosnia and Herzegovina under-21 international footballers
FK Kozara Gradiška players
FK Mladost Lučani players
FC Shakhtyor Soligorsk players
FC Akhmat Grozny players
First League of the Republika Srpska players
Serbian SuperLiga players
Russian Premier League players
Bosnia and Herzegovina expatriate footballers
Expatriate footballers in Serbia
Bosnia and Herzegovina expatriate sportspeople in Serbia
Expatriate footballers in Belarus
Bosnia and Herzegovina expatriate sportspeople in Belarus
Expatriate footballers in Russia
Bosnia and Herzegovina expatriate sportspeople in Russia